The Sweet Home School District (#55) is a public school district serving Sweet Home, Oregon, United States and the surrounding communities of Crawfordsville, Holley, Cascadia, and Liberty, and the Pleasant Valley area.

History

Early history
The district was incorporated in Oregon in 1965, although district records go back to at least 1912. Crawfordsville School District was consolidated into the Sweet Home District in 1965.

Modern history
In 1990, the district was the largest recipient in the state of tax revenues from private timber harvest.

In 2011, The Center for American Progress recognized the Sweet Home School District for receiving the organization's highest Return on Investment score in a nationwide study comparing student achievement relative to available funding. Sweet Home, North Clackamas and Gladstone were the only school districts in Oregon to receive the organization's highest achievement score in all areas measured.

Schools

High school

Sweet Home High School is a comprehensive high school serving approximately 750 students in grades 9 through 12.

Junior high school

Sweet Home Junior High School serves approximately 400 seventh and eighth grade students.

Elementary schools
Foster Elementary
Foster Elementary is a Kindergarten through sixth grade school located on the eastern edge of Sweet Home near Foster Reservoir.

Hawthorne Elementary
Hawthorne Elementary is a Kindergarten through sixth grade school located on Long Street in Sweet Home.

Holley Elementary
Holley Elementary is a Kindergarten through sixth grade school located in the community of Holley four miles southwest of Sweet Home.

Oak Heights Elementary
Oak Heights Elementary is a Kindergarten through sixth grade school located in the west side of Sweet Home.

Former schools
Crawfordsville School
Liberty School
Long Street School 
Pleasant Valley School
Cascadia School

See also
 List of school districts in Oregon

References

School districts in Oregon
Education in Linn County, Oregon
Sweet Home, Oregon
1965 establishments in Oregon
School districts established in 1965